Frans Christiaens (20 January 1914 – 5 April 1943) was a Belgian footballer. He played in five matches for the Belgium national football team from 1935 to 1936.

Football career
A goalkeeper, Christiaens' club lifelong was his native town's Lierse SK, playing in its youth team from 1925 to 1930, senior team thereafter.

Personal life and death
A sheet metal worker by trade, he was born at Lier, Belgium. Christiaens was killed during the Second World War during an American air raid on Mortsel, Belgium, on 5 April 1943.

References

External links
 

1914 births
1943 deaths
Belgian footballers
Belgium international footballers
Place of birth missing
Association football goalkeepers
Lierse S.K. players
Belgian civilians killed in World War II
Deaths by airstrike during World War II
People from Lier, Belgium
Footballers from Antwerp Province